Triplofusus is a genus of sea snails, marine gastropod mollusks in the family Fasciolariidae, the spindle snails, the tulip snails and their allies.

Species
Species within the genus Triplofusus include:
 Triplofusus giganteus (Kiener, 1840)
 Triplofusus princeps (G.B. Sowerby I, 1825)
Species brought into synonymy
 Triplofusus papillosus auct.: synonym of Triplofusus giganteus (Kiener, 1840)
 Triplofusus papillosus (G.B. Sowerby I, 1825)  (Original name, Fasciolaria papillosa, is a nomen dubium.)

References

 Snyder M.A., Vermeij G.J. & Lyons W.G. (2012) The genera and biogeography of Fasciolariinae (Gastropoda, Neogastropoda, Fasciolariidae). Basteria 76(1-3): 31-70

External links

Fasciolariidae